Canidia is a genus of beetles in the family Cerambycidae, containing the following species:

 Canidia canescens (Dillon, 1955)
 Canidia chemsaki Wappes & Lingafelter, 2005
 Canidia cincticornis Thomson, 1857
 Canidia giesberti Wappes & Lingafelter, 2005
 Canidia mexicana Thomson, 1860
 Canidia ochreostictica (Dillon, 1956)
 Canidia spinicornis (Bates, 1881)
 Canidia turnbowi Wappes & Lingafelter, 2005

References

Acanthocinini